{{DISPLAYTITLE:Yttrium (90Y) clivatuzumab tetraxetan}}

Yttrium (90Y) clivatuzumab tetraxetan (trade name hPAM4-Cide) is a humanized monoclonal antibody-drug conjugate designed for the treatment of pancreatic cancer. The antibody part, clivatuzumab (targeted at MUC1), is conjugated with tetraxetan, a chelator for yttrium-90, a radioisotope which destroys the tumour cells.

The drug was developed by Immunomedics, Inc.

In March 2016 the phase III PANCRIT-1 trial in metastatic pancreatic cancer was terminated early due to lack of improvement of overall survival.

References 

Monoclonal antibodies for tumors
Antibody-drug conjugates
Radiopharmaceuticals
Yttrium compounds